According to the US State Department's International Religious Freedom Report 2006; there are 72 Buddhists in Liechtenstein or 0.22% of the total population as of 2002. It could be the smallest Buddhist community in the World.

There is only 1 Buddhist centre  in Vaduz, the capital of Liechtenstein.

References
 International Religious Freedom Report 2006 - Liechtenstein

Liechtenstein
Religion in Liechtenstein
Lie